Home is an album by American jazz trumpeter Bill Hardman which was recorded in 1980 but not released on the Muse label until 1984.

Reception

The AllMusic review by Scott Yanow stated, "Always a bit underrated and overshadowed, trumpeter Bill Hardman was a solid soloist in the tradition of Clifford Brown. He led three Muse albums during 1978-81, of which this was the second. ... Hardman is heard in top form".

Track listing
 "Avila & Tequila" (Hank Mobley) − 6:04
 "Cubicle" (Walter Bishop Jr.) − 6:15
 "Too Little, Too Late" (Bill Lee) − 6:04
 "Focus" (Tadd Dameron) − 5:32
 "My One and Only Love" (Guy Wood, Robert Mellin) − 9:10
 "Minority" (Basheer Qusim) − 5:09

Personnel 
Bill Hardman − trumpet
Junior Cook − tenor saxophone
Slide Hampton − trombone
Walter Bishop Jr. − piano 
Stafford James − bass
Leroy Williams − drums
Mark Elf − guitar

References 

1984 albums
Bill Hardman albums
Muse Records albums